Brachidontes crebristriatus, also known as the Hawaiian mussel, nahawele liʻiliʻi or kio-nawahele, is a bivalve known only from Hawaiʻi.

Description 
This is a laterally compressed mussel that attaches to substrates by strong byssus threads. This species comes in a dark purple-brown color. They range in different sizes depending how old it gets. The small Hawaiian mussels grow up to 1/4 to 1/2 inches long but the adult mussel grows up to 1 inch or more in brackish waters. The largest Hawaiian mussels are sometimes called mahawele. They are to only eat phytoplankton.

Distribution & habitat 
The species occurs in the Hawai'i group in brackish water, on the seashore where there is fresh water or along limestone shorelines, usually at the low tide mark. They are found usually half buried or attached to rocks in clusters or in patches.

Human use 
Hawaiian mussels are a popular food item and are consumed both cooked and raw.

References 

 “Nahawele Lii LII – Hawaiian Mussel – Marine Mussels.” Hanalei River Heritage Foundation, https://hanaleiriverheritagefoundation.org/topic/nahawele-lii-lii-hawaiian-mussel-marine-mussels/.
 “Exploring Our Fluid Earth.” Phylum Mollusca | Manoa.hawaii.edu/ExploringOurFluidEarth, https://manoa.hawaii.edu/exploringourfluidearth/biological/invertebrates/phylum-mollusca.
 “Brachidontes Crebristriatus   (Conrad, 1837).” Brachidontes Crebristriatus, Hawaiian Mussel, https://www.sealifebase.ca/summary/Brachidontes-crebristriatus.html.
 Marine Invertebrates - Dlnr.hawaii.gov. https://dlnr.hawaii.gov/wildlife/files/2019/03/SWAP-2015-Bivalves-Final.pdf.
 Mussels - Marine Invertebrates of Kaloko-Honokohau National Historical Park, http://www.botany.hawaii.edu/basch/uhnpscesu/htms/kahoinvr/family/mytilid.htm.

Mytilidae